Karol Daniel Hanke (6 September 1903 – 15 April 1964) was a Polish football player who played for ŁKS Łódź and Pogoń Lwów. He debuted for the Poland National Football Team on 29 June 1924 in a 2-0 win against Turkey, while capping his final match on 1 July 1928 against Sweden (2-1). He earned 9 cap for the National Team scoring 0 goals.

References

1903 births
1964 deaths
Footballers from Łódź
People from Piotrków Governorate
Polish footballers
Poland international footballers
ŁKS Łódź players
Pogoń Lwów players
Polish football managers
Legia Warsaw managers
Association football midfielders